The Swedish Futsal Championship (SM i futsal) is the premier  futsal competition in  Sweden and is organised by the Svenska Fotbollförbundet.

The tournament previously consisted of several regional tournaments, but since the season 2014/15 the Swedish Futsal League acts as the qualification round. The top four teams play the Final Four to determine the champion. 

The official championship was played for the first time in 2003/04.

Champions by year

Footnotes

External links
 www.futsalplanet.com
www.svenskfotboll.se

Swedish futsal competitions
Sweden
1994 establishments in Sweden
Futsal

it:Campionato svedese di calcio a 5